The , also called  were operated by the Imperial Japanese Navy, designed and built by Mitsubishi Corporation, between 1943 and 1944, as cargo carriers.

The Japanese constructed only three of these during World War II, although twenty were planned.

 was laid down on 18 March 1942, and she was commissioned on 28 December 1943 into the 11th Submarine Squadron. After training in Japan she was selected for a Yanagi (exchange) mission to Germany. Her cargo consisted of rubber, gold, quinine, and Japanese engineers to Germany.
 survived the war, but she was scuttled by the US Navy off the Gotō Islands in 1946.

See also 
Cruiser submarine

References

Submarine classes